What's Alan Watching? was a 1989 CBS television series pilot.

Overview
Produced by Eddie Murphy and his company, Eddie Murphy Television, What's Alan Watching? starred Corin Nemec as Alan, a 17-year-old couch potato who views life, and his family, as if they were on television. Libby (Barbara Barrie) and Leo (Peter Michael Goetz) are his parents, Gail (future sitcom star Fran Drescher) is his sister, Jeff (David Packer) is his brother and Alyssa (Cheryl Pollak) is his girlfriend. Murphy also had a cameo in the episode, playing a protester decrying James Brown's incarceration, as well as Brown himself.

The episode was directed by Thomas Schlamme and aired on CBS on February 27, 1989. The network passed on making it a regular series, but What's Alan Watching? did win the Television Critics Association's TCA Award for Outstanding Achievement in Movies, Miniseries and Specials.

See also
 Dream On (1990)
 Remote Control (1987)

In Popular Culture

TV Critic Alan Sepinwall named his personal television blog "What's Alan Watching?" after the television program.  The blog was used to recap, and review television programs after they had aired the night before. Alan Sepinwall is credited with being one of the television reviewers who popularized the recap and review format for post-air television discussions in the blogosphere.

References

External links

1989 American television episodes
1989 in American television
1980s American comedy television series
1980s American television specials
CBS original programming
Television pilots not picked up as a series